Schroders UK Public Private Trust, formerly Woodford Patient Capital Trust is a British investment trust dedicated to long-term investments predominantly in the United Kingdom, established in 2015. It is listed on the London Stock Exchange. The chairman is Susan Searle.

The fund was managed by Woodford Investment Management led by Neil Woodford until December 2019 when the fund came under the management of Schroders.

Among other early stage investments, through its portfolio company, Industrial Heat, the trust is the world's largest institutional investor in the pseudoscientific Cold Fusion technology.

The trust changed its name from Woodford Patient Capital Trust to Schroders UK Public Private Trust on 16 December 2019.

References

External links
  Official site

Investment trusts of the United Kingdom